Ian Rogers DuBose (born January 16, 1999) is an American professional basketball player for BC Kolín of the Czech National Basketball League (NBL). He played college basketball for the Houston Baptist Huskies and the Wake Forest Demon Deacons.

Early life and high school career
DuBose attended the Ravenscroft School, where he was a member of the National Honor Society. He averaged 15 points and 2.6 assists per game as a junior. As a senior, he averaged 20.4 points, 7.8 rebounds, and 5.4 assists per game. DuBose was lightly recruited by major programs, generally considered a backup option in case their top prospect signed elsewhere. However, he was considered the top option by Houston Baptist and he committed to the Huskies in October 2019.

College career
DuBose started every game as a freshman, averaging 12.5 points and 5.5 rebounds per game. DuBose averaged 17 points, 5.9 rebounds, 3.4 assists and 1.6 steals per game as a sophomore, shooting 43.8 percent from three-point range. He was named to the Second Team All-Southland. On January 2, 2020 he scored a career-high 44 points and had 11 rebounds in a 111–107 overtime win against Central Arkansas. As a junior, DuBose averaged 19 points, 7.3 rebounds and 3.8 assists per game. He was named to the Second Team All-Southland for the second consecutive season and earned Southland men's basketball student-athlete of the year honors with a 3.84 grade point average. DuBose opted to transfer to Wake Forest as a graduate transfer, choosing the Demon Deacons over offers from NC State, Arkansas, Northwestern, DePaul and Georgetown. He remained with the program despite the firing of coach Danny Manning after having a conversation with new coach Steve Forbes. During his senior season, DuBose missed more than two months of gameplay due to a COVID-19 shutdown and an undisclosed medical issue. In 11 games as a senior, he averaged 10.9 points and 4.6 rebounds per game. Following the season, DuBose opted to turn professional rather than take advantage of the additional season of eligibility, granted by the NCAA due to the COVID-19 pandemic.

Professional career
On August 20, 2021, DuBose signed his first professional contract with the Kirchheim Knights of the German ProA league. DuBose was selected with the 12th pick of the second round in the 2021 NBA G League draft by the Fort Wayne Mad Ants. However, he was waived on October 29. On November 23, DuBose signed with BC Kolín of the Czech National Basketball League (NBL).

Career statistics

College

|-
| style="text-align:left;"| 2017–18
| style="text-align:left;"| Houston Baptist
| 31 || 30 || 28.6 || .406 || .350 || .620 || 5.5 || 2.0 || 1.4 || .4 || 12.5
|-
| style="text-align:left;"| 2018–19
| style="text-align:left;"| Houston Baptist
| 30 || 30 || 30.4 || .486 || .438 || .707 || 5.9 || 3.4 || 1.6 || .3 || 17.0
|-
| style="text-align:left;"| 2019–20
| style="text-align:left;"| Houston Baptist
| 29 || 28 || 33.1 || .439 || .326 || .775 || 7.3 || 3.8 || 1.4 || .3 || 19.0
|-
| style="text-align:left;"| 2020–21
| style="text-align:left;"| Wake Forest
| 11 || 10 || 24.6 || .456 || .361 || .595 || 4.6 || 2.4 || 1.4 || .2 || 10.9
|- class="sortbottom"
| style="text-align:center;" colspan="2"| Career
| 101 || 98 || 30.0 || .445 || .370 || .699 || 6.0 || 3.0 || 1.5 || .3 || 15.5

Personal life
In addition to basketball, DuBose plays the double bass.

References

External links
Wake Forest Demon Deacons bio
Houston Baptist Huskies bio

1999 births
Living people
21st-century African-American people
American expatriate basketball people in Germany
American men's basketball players
Basketball players from North Carolina
Houston Christian Huskies men's basketball players
Ravenscroft School alumni
Shooting guards
Sportspeople from Durham, North Carolina
VfL Kirchheim Knights players
Wake Forest Demon Deacons men's basketball players